Düsseldorf Hauptbahnhof is the main railway station of Düsseldorf, the state capital of North Rhine-Westphalia, Germany.

History

The station was opened on 1 October 1891. It replaced the three following stations:
the Bergisch-Märkische station of the Bergisch-Märkische Railway Company (BME), originally opened by the Düsseldorf-Elberfeld Railway Company in 1838 in the area that is now Graf-Adolf-Platz as a through station on the company's east–west line from  Elberfeld to its station at Rheinknie.
the Cologne-Minden station which the Cologne-Minden Railway Company (CME) opened in 1845 southeast of the BME station as a terminus to which branches were built from the company's north–south Cologne–Duisburg main line, and
the Rhenish station built by the Rhenish Railway Company (RhE) in 1877 in Düsseldorf-Pempelfort at the end of a branch line from its north–south Troisdorf–Mülheim-Speldorf line. The branch line was the first section of a line to Dortmund, which two years later was completed as far as Mettmann.

Both the Bergisch-Märkische and the Cologne-Minden stations were on the southern edge of the city and were in the way of the construction of Friedrichstadt. The wish to clear the way for the new development was a reason to build a new station in addition to the desire to bring together the stations and lines following the nationalisation of the railway companies of Rhineland-Westphalia between 1879 and 1882.

Construction of station building in the 1930s
The original Hauptbahnhof was built in the Wilhelmine style. After three decades it had become too small and its style had become unfashionable. In November 1930, eight designs were submitted to the public as part of a competition to redesign the station. The station building was built from 1932 to 1936 conforming to a design dictated by the Reichsbahn directorate of Wuppertal and its architects, Krüger and Eduard Behne. It features a notable clock tower.

The station underwent major reconstruction in the 1980s, finishing in 1985, when the Stadtbahn lines passing under the station were opened. This reconstruction involved the remodeling of the old ticket offices into a food court, the installation of lifts and the opening of the station toward the city borough of Oberbilk, where, at the western exit of the station, new office buildings were erected on the site of a former steel works.  The former 1st class waiting room has been remodeled into a hotel and a discothèque. 

Some minor changes were carried out in the year 2005; the old toilets from 1985 were torn out to make room for a fast food restaurant, a small 1st class lounge was installed in the northern passenger tunnel also. The dated ceilings and information systems in the passenger tunnels are scheduled for replacement also, as they do not meet current fire protection standards.

Operational usage

The station is frequented by roughly a quarter million passengers per day and is therefore Germany's tenth busiest station. 

All modes of rail transport are offered on the 20 main line tracks (16 platforms currently in use), including InterCityExpress, InterCity, EuroCity trains for long-distance travel, austrian operated ÖBB Nightjet overnight trains, motorail trains as well as RegionalExpress, RegionalBahn and S-Bahn services for regional distribution. The station is integrated into the Rhein-Ruhr S-Bahn network and local traffic operates under the Verkehrsverbund Rhein-Ruhr transport association. The subterranean station, operated by Rheinbahn, has 4 tracks that are part of the Stadtbahn lines of Düsseldorf. The 6 tramway stops in front of the station connect the Hauptbahnhof to the local tram network, also operated by Rheinbahn.

Long-distance
The station is served by the following long-distance services:

Regional services
In local passenger service, Düsseldorf is served by the following regional and S-Bahn lines (as of 2022):

Stadtbahn services

The following Rhine-Ruhr Stadtbahn services stop at Düsseldorf Hauptbahnhof:

 
 
 
 
 
 
 

In addition, Düsseldorf Hauptbahnhof is also served by Tram lines 704, 707, 708 and 709.

References

!
Railway stations in Germany opened in 1891
Rhine-Ruhr S-Bahn stations
S1 (Rhine-Ruhr S-Bahn)
S6 (Rhine-Ruhr S-Bahn)
S8 (Rhine-Ruhr S-Bahn)
S11 (Rhine-Ruhr S-Bahn)
S28 (Rhine-Ruhr S-Bahn)
!